FEATool Multiphysics ("Finite Element Analysis Toolbox for Multiphysics") is a physics, finite element analysis (FEA), and PDE simulation toolbox. FEATool Multiphysics features the ability to model fully coupled heat transfer, fluid dynamics, chemical engineering, structural mechanics, fluid-structure interaction (FSI), electromagnetics, as well as user-defined and custom PDE problems in 1D, 2D (axisymmetry), or 3D, all within a graphical user interface (GUI) or optionally as script files. FEATool has been employed and used in academic research, teaching, and industrial engineering simulation contexts.

Distinguishing features

FEATool Multiphysics is a fully integrated physics and PDE simulation environment where the modeling process is subdivided into six steps; preprocessing (CAD and geometry modeling), mesh and grid generation, physics and PDE specification, boundary condition specification, solution, and postprocessing and visualization.

Easy to use GUI
The FEATool graphical user interface (GUI) shown above was designed for ease of use and minimal prerequisite knowledge. Specifically, because of the full integration of CAD and simulation tools users can switch between pre-processing, analysis, and post-processing modes to change simulation parameters, modify geometry and meshes, to solution evaluation and visualization. In this way FEATool can make up for any performance overhead by saving users time with problem set up and analysis.

OpenFOAM and SU2 CFD solver interfaces
FEATool has introduced a multi-simulation feature whereby interfaces to popular academic and open-source solvers are developed. This feature enables these solvers to be used from the FEATool GUI and CLI without detailed knowledge of the syntax or peculiarities of each solver.

The CFD solver interfaces allows fluid dynamics problems to be solved with the finite volume CFD solvers OpenFOAM and SU2. Using the interfaces automatically converts incompressible Navier-Stokes FEATool models to compatible OpenFOAM/SU2 mesh, boundary, and control dictionary files, runs simulations, and afterwards imports and interpolates the resulting solutions back into FEATool. In this way more advanced, larger, and parallel CFD models, for example including turbulence, can be simulated without leaving the FEATool interface.

FEniCS multiphysics solver interface
Similar to the OpenFOAM and SU2 solver interfaces, FEATool also features a fully integrated interface to the FEniCS general FEM and multiphysics solver. Using the FEATool-FEniCS interface, as both codes feature PDE definition languages, multiphysics problems can automatically be translated and converted to FEniCS Python definition files, after which system calls to the FEniCS solver is made, and the resulting solution re-imported.

Fully scriptable CLI interface
GUI operation is recorded as equivalent function calls, and therefore in addition to binary formats, FEATool simulation models can also be saved and exported as fully scriptable and editable MATLAB compatible m-script files. The short MATLAB script below illustrates how a complete flow around a cylinder computational fluid dynamics (CFD) benchmark problem can be defined and solved with the FEATool m-script functions (including geometry, grid generation, problem definition, solving, and postprocessing all in a few lines of code). Specifically, custom  partial differential equations (PDE) and expressions can simply be entered and evaluated as string expressions as-is, without need for further compilation or writing custom functions.

% Geometry and mesh generation.
fea.sdim = { 'x' 'y' };
fea.geom.objects = { gobj_rectangle( 0, 2.2, 0, 0.41, 'R1' ), ...
                     gobj_circle( [0.2 0.2], 0.05, 'C1' ) };
fea = geom_apply_formula( fea, 'R1-C1' );
fea.grid = gridgen( fea, 'hmax', 0.02 );

% Problem definition (incompressible Navier-Stokes equations multiphysics mode).
fea = addphys( fea, @navierstokes );

% Prescribe fluid viscosity (density is default 1).
fea.phys.ns.eqn.coef{2,end} = { 0.001 };

% Boundary conditions (Non-specified boundaries are
% per default prescribed no-slip zero velocity walls).

% Inflow (bc type 2) at boundary 4.
fea.phys.ns.bdr.sel(4) = 2;

% Outflow (bc type 3, zero pressure) at boundary 2.
fea.phys.ns.bdr.sel(2) = 3;

% Parabolic inflow profile x-velocity expression.
fea.phys.ns.bdr.coef{2,end}{1,4} = '4*0.3*y*(0.41-y)/0.41^2';

% Check, parse, and solve problem.
fea = parsephys( fea );
fea = parseprob( fea );
fea.sol.u = solvestat( fea );

% Alternatively solve with OpenFOAM or SU2
% fea.sol.u = openfoam( fea );
% fea.sol.u = su2( fea );

% Postprocessing and visualization.
postplot( fea, 'surfexpr', 'sqrt(u^2+v^2)', ...
               'arrowexpr', {'u' 'v'} )

p_cyl_front = evalexpr( 'p', [0.15; 0.2], fea );
p_cyl_back  = evalexpr( 'p', [0.25; 0.2], fea );
delta_p_computed  = p_cyl_front - p_cyl_back
delta_p_reference = 0.117520

External mesh generator interfaces
Similar to the external solver interfaces, FEATool features built-in support for the Gmsh and Triangle mesh generators. If requested instead of the built-in mesh generation algorithm, FEATool will convert and export appropriate Gridgen2D, Gmsh, or Triangle input data files, call the mesh generators through external system calls, and re-import the resulting grids into FEATool.

Other distinguishing features
 Stand-alone operation (without MATLAB) or can be used as a MATLAB toolbox.
 Fully cross platform MATLAB interoperability including other toolboxes.
 Extensive FEM basis function library (linear and high order conforming P1-P5, non-conforming, bubble, and vector FEM discretizations).
 Support for structured and un-structured line interval, triangles, quadrilaterals, tetrahedral, and hexahedral mesh elements.
 28 pre-defined equations and multiphysics modes in 1D, 2D Cartesian and cylindrical coordinates, as well as full 3D.
 Support for custom user defined PDE equations.
 Mesh and geometry import, export, and conversion between OpenFOAM, SU2, Dolfin/FEniCS XML, GiD, Gmsh, GMV, Triangle (PSLG), and plain ASCII grid formats.
 Online postprocssing and image export with ParaView Glance, Plotly, and social sharing of results.

See also
 Multiphysics
  Computer-aided engineering (CAE)
 Continuum mechanics
  Finite element method (FEM)

References

External Links 
 FEATool Multiphysics website

Computational fluid dynamics
Computer-aided engineering software
Continuum mechanics
Finite element software
Finite element software for Linux
Scientific simulation software
Physics software